Hizabad or Hiz Abad may refer to:
 Hizabad-e Bala, a village in Zaboli Rural District, in the Central District of Mehrestan County, Sistan and Baluchestan Province, Iran
 Hizabad-e Pain, a village in Zaboli Rural District, in the Central District of Mehrestan County, Sistan and Baluchestan Province, Iran